Satyendra Narayan Kushwaha was an Indian politician from Bharatiya Janata Party, Bihar who served as the member of Bihar Legislative Council from 2012 till his death in 2018. He has served in various capacities in the organization of the BJP as the President of the BJYM, Bihar in 2005, State President of the BJP Kisan Morcha in 2007, State Secretary of the Bharatiya Janata Party, Bihar in 2009. He also served as the co-incharge of the Bharatiya Janata Party, Uttar Pradesh.

Illness and death 
Kushwaha was admitted to the Indira Gandhi Institute of Medical Sciences two years ago after he suffered a brain stroke. He breathed his last at 1:35 AM on 10th January

References 

1969 births
2018 deaths
Bharatiya Janata Party politicians from Bihar
Members of the Bihar Legislative Council
People from Patna district